Mastigolina rufocomata is a species of tephritid or fruit flies in the genus Mastigolina of the family Tephritidae.

Distribution
Kenya.

References

Tephritinae
Insects described in 1947
Diptera of Africa